Alejandro Mon y Menéndez (26 February 1801 in Oviedo, Principality of Asturias, Spain – 1 November 1882) was a Spanish politician and jurist who was prime minister of Spain in 1864, during the reign of Queen Isabella II.

Early life
Mon was born in Oviedo and was the eldest son of Miguel Mon y Miranda and Francisca Menéndez y de la Torre. His only sister, Manuela, was married to the Asturian Pedro José Pidal, 1st Marquis of Pidal, another prominent politician who served several times as prime minister.

He studied law in the University of Oviedo, where he became interested in politics and approached the Moderate Party.

Political career
In the regency of Queen Maria Christina of the Two Sicilies (1833–1840), Mon was appointed for his first high political office, minister of finance from 1837 to 1838, in a moderate cabinet headed by Narciso Fernández de Heredia, 2nd Count of Heredia-Spínola. During the regency of the progressivist Baldomero Espartero (1840–1843), he was in none of the cabinets but remained active in political life.

When the moderates came back to power in 1844, a period started known as the Moderate Decade, Mon was called by the new prime minister, Ramón María Narváez, 1st Duke of Valencia, again as minister of finance. He held this post from 1844 to 1845 and carried out the tax reform of 1845, which established the basis of the current tax system of Spain. It was executed in collaboration with Ramón de Santillán, and it is popularly known as the Mon-Santillán reform.

After the downfall of the moderates, the unionist Leopoldo O'Donnell, 1st Duke of Tetuan, offered him several ministerial portfolios, which he always declined. Mon preferred to be in posts away from the first line of political life, such as ambassador to the Holy See or to France. However, he returned to active politics in 1864, when he replaced Lorenzo Arrazola y García as prime minister, but his cabinet lasted only nine months because of the social and political instability. Five years later, the Spanish Glorious Revolution took place.

Retirement
Mon lived long enough to see the reign of Amadeo I of Spain, the First Spanish Republic and finally the Restoration of King Alfonso XII, which he supported as a personal friend of Antonio Cánovas del Castillo. However, he was not active politically during the Restoration but kept only the honorary post of life senator. He retired to his home town, Oviedo, where he died in 1882.

References
Comin, Francisco, Alejandro Mon y Menéndez (1801−1882). Pensamiento y reforma de la Hacienda, Instituto de Estudios Fiscales, Madrid, 2001. 
Fernández de la Mora, Gonzalo (2001), Mon en su siglo in galeon.com 

Prime Ministers of Spain
Economy and finance ministers of Spain
Presidents of the Congress of Deputies (Spain)
People from Oviedo
1801 births
1882 deaths
Liberal Union (Spain) politicians
Moderate Party (Spain) politicians
19th-century Spanish politicians
Ambassadors of Spain to France
Ambassadors of Spain to the Holy See
1864 in Spain
University of Oviedo alumni